Yvonne Field is a British activist and social entrepreneur. She is founder and CEO of the Ubele Initiative. In 2018 Field was named among the top 100 women in social enterprise (WISE100).

Life
Field studied in Birmingham, where she recalls hearing the news of the New Cross fire in 1981.

Responding to a historical lack of funding to the BAME community, Field established the Ubele Initiative in 2014, to support projects led by the African diaspora in the UK.

In February 2020 the Ubele Initiative was appointed one of five 'specialist civil society infrastructure organisations' to receive two years of grant funding from a partnership between the Mayor of London, City Bridge Trust and the National Lottery Community Fund. In April 2020 Field led the launch of a petition to investigate why BAME communities were being disproportionately impacted by COVID-19 in the UK. In May 2020 a Ubele Foundation report warned that Cov-19 might force many small BAME charities out of operation. Later that month Field welcomed the call by the Mayor of London, Sadiq Khan, for Prime Minister Boris Johnson to commission an independent public inquiry into COVID-19's disproportionate impact on BAME communities. In June 2020 Field, along with Derek Bardowell and Sado Jirde, resigned from an equity working group organised by the National Emergencies Trust. Field said that she felt "disillusioned", and that there was "no space in the agenda for any real meaningful dialogue". A follow-up Ubele Initiative report at the end of 2020 called for a national infrastructure body supporting BAME voluntary organisations.

References

External links
 Personal website

Year of birth missing (living people)
Living people
Black British activists
Social entrepreneurs